The sixth series of Gladiators aired in the UK from 13 September to 27 December 1997. It was originally planned to begin on 6 September 1997, but was delayed by a week following the death of Diana, Princess of Wales, and ITV's decision to broadcast a non-entertainment schedule that evening (which was the day of her funeral).

Gladiators

Episodes

 Wendy twisted her back while dropping off Tightrope. It was not too serious. However, it still forced her to withdraw from the competition. Paula Bush was selected as the substitute.
 Debbie injured her knee in whiplash and chose not to run the gauntlet out of concern that her injury will get worse.
 Debbie's knee injury got worse during her eliminator run on the trampette and did not finish the eliminator forcing her to retire from the competition. This left the clock as Wendy's only rival.
 These episodes only had whole events.
 Jayne picked up an injury in Powerball. Her injury only got worse, forcing her to retire from the competition. Because she withdrew at the eliminator, Christina won by default, however, she had to run against the clock.
 Again, the red step marks the no tackle zone. Gladiators can't tackle above that step.
 Before the start of the quarter-finals, Carl Wooton could not compete due to an injury and he had to leave the show. As the fastest loser from the heats, Gordon James was selected to be the first substitute for the quarter-finals.
 Brian fractured a bone in Powerball and was sent off to A&E. Adam Stretton had the second-fastest losing eliminator time in the heats and was therefore the substitute.
 Both Wolf and Gordon were issued a yellow card. Wolf shoved Gordon off the pyramid after time was up, and then the two of them wrestled during the interview with Jeremy Guscott in the aftermath of Gordon's taunting.
 Halfway through Powerball, Helen sustained an ankle injury. The men's Powerball was played while she was being examined. Ultimately she had to retire. Julie Hall was the fastest loser from the heats and was, therefore, the substitute.
 Ronnie was injured in Pyramid and his injury got worse by the eliminator. After falling off the first seesaw, Ronnie could not run up the travelator and did not finish the eliminator. Ultimately he had to retire.
 Warrior jumped the whistle twice and therefore, Adam was awarded 10 points.
 These events had the female Gladiators against the male contenders.
 One female and one male gladiator competed in this event.
 The contender started on the pole for this special episode.
 Wille Carson chickened out for no points, however, his two teammates just competed against Khan for fun.
 The Jockeys gave up their head start knowing this show was for charity.

References

1997 British television seasons
series six